Municipal elections were held in Finland on 20 October 1996. The election had to be renewed in Keminmaa on 8 June because of uncertainties with advance voting.

National results

References

Municipal elections in Finland
Municipal
Finland